Conor Heun (born February 11, 1979) is a retired American mixed martial artist. A professional from 2006 until 2012, he competed for Strikeforce, EliteXC, and the Los Angeles Anacondas of the International Fight League.

Mixed martial arts career

EliteXC
Heun made his Television debut on a ShoXC card against Marlon Mathias. Mathais broke Heun's jaw a minute and a half into the first round with a knee, but Heun kept fighting and won the close fight via majority decision. His next fight was a second-round TKO stoppage of James Edson Berto.

Strikeforce
Heun made his Strikeforce debut against former UFC fighter Jorge Gurgel on a ShoMMA card in June 2009.  He lost the fight via decision.

After a year off due to injury, he returned to the promotion on the Strikeforce: Los Angeles card.  He faced boxer and former EliteXC lightweight champion K. J. Noons and lost via split decision.

Conor fought Magno Almeida on the Strikeforce: Overeem vs. Werdum undercard, and won in a unanimous decision, though Almeida dislocated Conor's elbow.
 
Heun faced Ryan Couture at Strikeforce: Tate vs. Rousey on March 3, 2012. He lost the fight via TKO in the third round.

Personal life
Heun studied English literature, journalism, and organizational communications learning and design at Ithaca College.

Mixed martial arts record

|-
| Loss
| align=center| 9–5
| Ryan Couture
| TKO (punches)
| Strikeforce: Tate vs. Rousey
| 
| align=center| 3
| align=center| 2:52
| Columbus, Ohio, United States
| 
|-
| Win
| align=center| 9–4
| Magno Almeida
| Decision (unanimous)
| Strikeforce: Overeem vs. Werdum
| 
| align=center| 3
| align=center| 5:00
| Dallas, Texas, United States
| 
|-
| Loss
| align=center| 8–4
| K. J. Noons
| Decision (split)
| Strikeforce: Los Angeles
| 
| align=center| 3
| align=center| 5:00
| Los Angeles, California, United States
|Catchweight (160 lbs) bout.
|-
| Loss
| align=center| 8–3
| Jorge Gurgel
| Decision (unanimous)
| Strikeforce Challengers: Villasenor vs. Cyborg
| 
| align=center| 3
| align=center| 5:00
| Kent, Washington, United States
|Catchweight (158 lbs) bout.
|-
| Win
| align=center| 8–2
| James Edson Berto
| TKO (punches and elbows)
| EliteXC: Heat
| 
| align=center| 2
| align=center| 2:18
| Sunrise, Florida, United States
| 
|-
| Win
| align=center| 7–2
| Marlon Mathias
| Decision (majority)
| ShoXC: Elite Challenger Series
| 
| align=center| 3
| align=center| 5:00
| Santa Ynez, California, United States
| 
|-
| Win
| align=center| 6–2
| Noah Shinable
| Submission (armbar)
| OctoberFist 2007: Fight Night on Fright Night
| 
| align=center| 1
| align=center| 1:17
| Orange County, California, United States
| 
|-
| Loss
| align=center| 5–2
| LC Davis
| Decision (split)
| International Fight League
| 
| align=center| 3
| align=center| 4:00
| East Rutherford, New Jersey, United States
| 
|-
| Win
| align=center| 5–1
| Tristan Wit
| Submission (armbar)
| IFL: Everett
| 
| align=center| 1
| align=center| 3:59
| Everett, Washington, United States
| 
|-
| Win
| align=center| 4–1
| Gilbert Salinas
| Submission (D'arce choke)
| Total Fighting Alliance 6
| 
| align=center| 1
| align=center| 1:37
| Santa Monica, California, United States
| 
|-
| Win
| align=center| 3–1
| Clint Coronel
| Decision (split)
| IFL: Los Angeles
| 
| align=center| 3
| align=center| 4:00
| Los Angeles, California, United States
| 
|-
| Win
| align=center| 2–1
| Jonathan Pastrana
| Submission (guillotine choke)
| TFA 5: Conflict on the Coast
| 
| align=center| 2
| align=center| 1:23
| Santa Monica, California, United States
|Return to Lightweight.
|-
| Loss
| align=center| 1–1
| Brett Cooper
| Decision (split)
| TFA 4: Fight Night on Fright Night
| 
| align=center| 3
| align=center| 5:00
| Carson, California, United States
|Welterweight debut.
|-
| Win
| align=center| 1–0
| Martin Hench
| Submission (rear naked choke)
| PF 1: The Beginning
| 
| align=center| 2
| align=center| 0:46
| Hollywood, California, United States
|

See also
 List of Strikeforce alumni

References

External links
 

Living people
1979 births
American male mixed martial artists
Mixed martial artists utilizing Brazilian jiu-jitsu
Mixed martial artists from California
Mixed martial artists from Colorado
American practitioners of Brazilian jiu-jitsu
Ithaca College alumni